The 2012 Six Nations Championship, known as the 2012 RBS 6 Nations due to the tournament's sponsorship by the Royal Bank of Scotland, was the 13th series of the Six Nations Championship. The annual northern hemisphere rugby union championship was contested by England, France, Ireland, Italy, Scotland and Wales.

Including the competition's previous incarnations as the Home Nations Championship and Five Nations Championship, it was the 118th tournament of the annual European championship.

For the first time since 2008, there were no Friday night fixtures.

Whilst Italy continued to play their home matches in Rome, they used the Stadio Olimpico instead of the Stadio Flaminio, which Italy had used for their home Championship fixtures since entering the competition in 2000. The Championship was won by Wales, who achieved their third Grand Slam in eight tournaments.

Participants 
The teams involved were:

Squads

Table

Results

Round 1

Nicolas Mas and Thierry Dusautoir (both France) earned their 50th caps.
Wesley Fofana, Yoann Maestri (both France), Tobias Botes and Giovanbattista Venditti (both Italy) made their international debuts in this match.
Vincent Clerc's try was the 32nd of his international career, placing him joint second with his coach Philippe Saint-André on the French try scoring list. (To this date, Serge Blanco remains the top French try scorer with 38.)

Brad Barritt, Lee Dickson, Phil Dowson, Owen Farrell, Ben Morgan, Geoff Parling, Jordan Turner-Hall (all England) and Lee Jones (Scotland) made their international debuts.
 Chris Robshaw of England captained his team earning only his second cap in this match.
 This match turned out to be Dan Parks's last appearance with the Scotland jersey as he announced his retirement from international rugby a few days after the game.

 Huw Bennett (Wales) earned his 50th cap.
 Coming off the bench in the 76th minute to replace Johnny Sexton, Ronan O'Gara became the most capped Irish player with 117 caps, jointly with Brian O'Driscoll. O'Gara also took sole possession of the all-time lead for appearances in the Championship, with 57. He had previously been level with his countryman Mike Gibson, who made 56 appearances in the Five Nations between  1964 and  1979.

Round 2

 Luca Morisi (Italy) and Rob Webber (England) made their international debuts.
 The four-point margin in this match is the joint-closest Italy have ever come to beating England.

This match was postponed due to an unplayable pitch. It was the first weather-related postponement of a Five/Six Nations game since 1985. The match was rescheduled for 4 March.

 Lou Reed, Aaron Shingler (both Wales), Stuart Hogg and Ed Kalman (both Scotland) made their international debuts.

Round 3

 Peter O'Mahony (Ireland) made his international debut.
 Coming off the bench in the 69th minute to replace Gordon D'Arcy, Ronan O'Gara overtook Brian O'Driscoll as the most-capped Irish player with 118 caps.

Wales won their 20th Triple Crown.

 Duncan Weir (Scotland) made his international debut.

Rescheduled match

Round 4

 Rhys Webb (Wales) and Fabio Staibano (Italy) made their international debuts.

 Matt Scott (Scotland) made his international debut.

Round 5

Scotland were whitewashed. This was the first time since  2007 that Italy avoided the wooden spoon.
Italy's starting pack in this match was the most capped ever to play an international match.

Matthew Rees (Wales) earned his 50th cap.
Jean-Marcellin Buttin (France) made his international debut.
William Servat and Julien Bonnaire (both France) played their final matches.
Wales won the  Grand Slam.

Media coverage 
In the United Kingdom, all the matches were televised on BBC channels. In Ireland, RTÉ Two and RTÉ Two HD televised all the matches live. S4C televised Wales matches while French international channel TV5Monde televised only France matches and was available internationally (including the United States). In the United States BBC America and BBC America HD televised some matches.

Notes

References

External links 

Official site

 
2012 rugby union tournaments for national teams
2012
2011–12 in European rugby union
2011–12 in Irish rugby union
2011–12 in English rugby union
2011–12 in Welsh rugby union
2011–12 in Scottish rugby union
2011–12 in French rugby union
2011–12 in Italian rugby union
February 2012 sports events in Europe
March 2012 sports events in Europe
Royal Bank of Scotland